Work and Non Work is a compilation album by British indie electronic group Broadcast, released 9 June 1997 by Warp. The album compiled material from their early singles and The Book Lovers EP.

Track listing

References

Broadcast (band) compilation albums
1997 compilation albums
Warp (record label) compilation albums